Riviera Gardens is one of the largest private housing estates in Tsuen Wan, New Territories, Hong Kong.

The estate is bounded by Tsing Tsuen Road, Wing Shun Street and Rambler Channel. Formerly the Caltex' oil depot, the estate was developed by New World Development and Caltex Petroleum Corporation. It consists of 19 residential blocks, podium and shopping arcade, which were completed from 1988 to 1990.

Demographics
According to the 2016 by-census, Riviera Gardens had a population of 17,278. The median age was 43.6 and the majority of residents (93.2 per cent) were of Chinese ethnicity. The average household size was 3.2 people. The median monthly household income of all households (i.e. including both economically active and inactive households) was HK$40,000.

Politics
Riviera Gardens is located in Hoi Bun constituency of the Tsuen Wan District Council. It was formerly represented by Lester Shum, who was elected in the 2019 elections until May 2021.

Education 
Riviera Gardens is in Primary One Admission (POA) School Net 62, which includes schools in Tsuen Wan and areas nearby. The net includes multiple aided schools and one government school, Hoi Pa Street Government Primary School.

See also
 Wong Tung & Partners

References

External links

Official site of Riviera Gardens

Private housing estates in Hong Kong
Tsuen Wan
New World Development
Texaco
Residential buildings completed in 1990